Mường Khương is a rural district of Lào Cai province in the Northeast region of Vietnam. Mường is as variation of  Mueang. As of 2003, the district had a population of 48,242. The district covers an area of 552 km². The district capital lies at Mường Khương.

Administrative divisions
Mường Khương, Lào Ca, Cao Sơn, Bản Lầu, Nậm Chảy, Tung Chung Phố, Tả Gia Khâu, Pha Long, Dìn Chin, Tả Ngải Chồ, Thanh Bình, Bản Sen, Lùng Khấu Nhin, La Pan Tẩn, Nấm Lư, Tả Thàng and Lùng Vai. 

Mường is a variation of  Mueang.

References

Districts of Lào Cai province
Lào Cai province